Grace Chanda (born 11 June 1997) is a Zambian professional footballer who plays as a midfielder for Spanish Liga F club Madrid CFF and the Zambia women's national team.

International career
Chanda represented Zambia at the 2018 Africa Women Cup of Nations and 2022 Africa Women Cup of Nations.

International goals
Scores and results list Zambia's goal tally first

References

External links

1997 births
Living people
Zambian women's footballers
Women's association football midfielders
ZESCO United F.C. players
Madrid CFF players
Zambia women's international footballers
Footballers at the 2020 Summer Olympics
Olympic footballers of Zambia
Zambian expatriate women's footballers
Zambian expatriate sportspeople in Spain
Expatriate women's footballers in Spain